War and genocide studies is an interdisciplinary subject that identifies and analyzes the relationship between war and genocide, as well as the structural foundations of associated conflicts. Disciplines involved may include political science, geography, economics, sociology, international relations, and history.

There is general consensus among scholars that the problems of war and genocide are intimately linked as the two often accompany each other. However, there are varying thoughts and theoretical perspectives on the topic as it continues to be a subject of scholarly analysis and debate.

Description 
Genocide is defined as the intentional destruction of people, a term coined in 1944 by Polish lawyer Rapheal Lemkin with the Greek word γένος (genos, “race, people”) and the Latin suffix -caedo (“act of killing”). The United Nations defines genocide in Article II of the Genocide Convention as:

Any of the following acts committed with intent to destroy, in whole or in part, a national, ethnical, racial or religious group, as such:

(a) Killing members of the group;

(b) Causing serious bodily or mental harm to members of the group;

(c) Deliberately inflicting on the group conditions of life calculated to bring about its physical destruction in whole or in part;

(d) Imposing measures intended to prevent births within the group;

(e) Forcibly transferring children of the group to another group.

The Genocide Convention also observes that genocide can take place in contexts of peaceful situations as well as in contexts of armed conflict. The United Nations also emphasizes the aspect that victims are deliberately targeted and killed not as individuals but as members of the targeted group. Popular characterizations of genocide include elements of brutality, occurring on a large and systematic scale, and its carrying out by armies as first-line agents.

Historical Background 
Norman Naimark writes: 
Surveys of twentieth century cases, often considered the “Age of Genocide” identify that when genocide was committed it was alongside some form of armed conflict.  The Armenian Genocide, Jewish Holocaust, Genocide in East Pakistan, Mayan Genocide, Kurdish Genocide, Tutsi Genocide, and Bosnian Genocide are all respectively linked with the First World War, Second World War, Bangladesh Liberation War, Guatemalan Civil War, Iran-Iraq War, Rwandan Civil War, and the Bosnian War. Scholars further observe this trend going into the twenty-first century, as the Darfur Genocide and the Yazidi Genocide are also associated with ongoing conflict in Western Sudan and Iraq. These observations have led many to conclude that genocides generally occur in wartime or as a response to armed conflict.

Scholars have also pointed to the introduction of concepts such as mass mobilization, mass political movements, mass media, and mass education as being important precedents for the concept of twentieth century genocide. Paul Bartrop observes that all cases of twentieth century genocide are accompanied with an aggressor's long-standing obsession with the physical, social, or cultural differences of a victim group as a threat so great that the aggressor believes mass annihilation in the only solution.

Human Toll 
Together, War and genocide have historically amounted to the large-scale destruction and devastation of peoples as both involve the deployment of violence through killing and physical harming to destroy the power of the enemy that often includes economic, political, and ideological coercion. An estimated 20 million people were killed as a result of the First World War with an additional 20 million wounded. The Armenian genocide alone resulted in the death of 600,000 to one million Armenians directly targeted with violence. By 1918, an estimated 90 percent of the Armenian population  in the Ottoman Empire was either killed or displaced. In the Second World War, an estimated 66 million people were killed in total and upwards of 6 million Jewish people were killed as a result of targeted violence.

Theoretical Perspectives 
Jeffrey S. Bachman identifies a continuum for schools of thought considering the relationship between war and genocide identifying the War or Genocide school, that believes there is no direct relationship between war and genocide, and the War is Genocide school, that believes genocide is inseparable from war, as the two extremes. Most scholars fall somewhere between these two positions.

The War is Genocide School 
The War is Genocide school is one extreme end of the spectrum that contends, as its synonymizing suggests, that war and genocide are one in the same. There are no scholars that identify with this position, rather it is a purely theoretical designation for its use in contextualizing other schools of thought. Criticism's of a purely War is Genocide approach include the fact that it does not consider defensive violence as separate from aggressive violence.

The War or Genocide School 
The War or Genocide school contends that the conduct of war should be wholly considered separately from genocide. Helen Fein insists that connecting mass killing to genocide conflates “war crimes and genocide without examining the pattern of destruction and the selection of victims,”. Irving Horowitz and Mark Levene distinguishes between armed conflicts and genocide by the moment at which the aggressor's aim in an armed civil conflict turns from defeating the enemy to a systematic effort to destroy them. Irving Horowitz also distinguishes war from genocide based on who is waging it: “democratic and libertarian states wage war as an instrument of foreign policy…genocide on the other hand, is the operational handmaiden of a particular social system, the totalitarian system,".  Similarly, on the subject of nuclear war, Barbara Harff makes the distinction based on intent: “Whether or not nuclear strikes are genocidal depends on the intent of those who order them. Limited and defensive use of nuclear weapons are not inherently genocidal, even if they have the unwanted consequences of massive civilian deaths,". Scholars in the War or Genocide school as a whole reject any fluidity between people killed in war and victims of genocide.

The War and Genocide School 
The War and Genocide school of thought encompasses the vast majority of scholars and contends that those killed in war can be considered victims of genocide. Scholars in this school reference the genocidal capacities of certain methods of war, such as nuclear weapons, pattern-, fire-, and carpet-bombing, or other indiscriminate strategies, as the use of genocidal violence.

The War as Genocide School 
Genocide has traditionally been distinguished by the innocent, defenseless, or civilian status of its victims. Manus Midlarsky defines genocide as “understood to be the state-sponsored systematic mass murder of innocent and helpless men, women, and children”. Similarly Irving Horowitz defines genocide as “a structural and systematic destruction of innocent people by a state bureaucratic apparatus”.  Finally, Kurt Jonassohn and Frank Chalk define genocide as “a form of one-sided mass killing”.

However the War as Genocide school contends that other groups such as military personnel should also be designated victims of genocide, and do not resign their right to life when engaging in defensive violence. Israel Charny believes that “the definition of genocide adopted in law and by professional social scientists must match the realities of life, so that there should be no situation in which thousands and even millions of defenseless victims of mass murder do not ‘qualify’ as victims of genocide,”. This school suggests that genocidal violence includes aggressive violence against armed victims, when the aim is to harm and kill a substantial number of people. The War as Genocide school does not necessarily equate war with genocide, as the War Is Genocide school does, but it does recognize a causal link between the two and acknowledges that aggressive violence may constitute genocide. This school also invites scholars to reconsider the use of war in international affairs as well as the concept of genocide as being based on the perceived innocence of those attacked. Some proponents of this school argue that some examples of twentieth century war is genocidal by nature, given the enormous number of deaths.

References

Sources

Genocide
War